Bittinger is an unincorporated community in Adams County, Pennsylvania, United States.

References

Unincorporated communities in Adams County, Pennsylvania
Unincorporated communities in Pennsylvania